37 may refer to: 
 37 (number), the natural number following 36 and preceding 38

Years
 37 BC
 AD 37
 1937
 2037

Other uses
 37 (album), by King Never, 2013
 37 (film), a 2016 film about the murder of Kitty Genovese
 37 (MBTA bus), a bus route in Boston, Massachusetts, US
 37 (New Jersey bus), a NJ Transit bus route in New Jersey, US
 "Thirty Seven", a song by Karma to Burn from the album Almost Heathen, 2001

See also
 37th (disambiguation)
 List of highways numbered 37